Junkanoo  is a street parade with music, dance, and costumes with origin in many islands across the English speaking Caribbean every Boxing Day (26 December) and New Year's Day (1 January). These cultural parades are predominantly showcased in the Bahamas where the music is also mainstreamed, and competition results are hotly contested. There are also Junkanoo parades in Miami in June and Key West in October, where local black populations have their roots in the Caribbean. In addition to being a culture dance for the Garifuna people, this type of dancing is also performed in The Bahamas on Independence day and other historical holidays. Historically, Junkanoo parades were also found in Southeastern North Carolina. However, the custom became less popular after slavery was abolished. The last known Jonkonnu celebration in the Southern United States was in Wilmington, N.C., in the late 1880s.  

Dances are choreographed to the beat of goatskin drums and cowbells.

History
The festival may have originated several centuries ago, when enslaved descendants of Africans on plantations in The Bahamas celebrated holidays granted around Christmas time with dance, music, and costumes. After emancipation the tradition continued and junkanoo evolved from simple origins to a formal, organised parade with intricate costumes, themed music and official prizes within various categories.

The origin of the word junkanoo is disputed. Theories include that it is named after a folk hero named John Canoe or that it is derived from the French gens inconnus (unknown people), as masks are worn by the revelers. Douglas Chambers, professor of African studies at the University of Southern Mississippi, suggests a possible Igbo origin from the Igbo yam deity Njoku Ji referencing festivities in time for the new yam festival. Chambers also suggests a link with the Igbo okonko masking tradition of southern Igboland, which feature horned maskers and other masked characters in similar style to jonkonnu masks. 
Similarities with the Yoruba Egungun festivals have also been identified. However, an Akan origin is more likely because the celebration of the Fancy Dress Festivals/Masquerades are the same Christmas week (December 25–January 1) in the Central and Western Regions of Ghana and also John Canoe was in fact an existing Ahanta king and hero that ruled Axim, Ghana, before 1720, the same year the John Canoe festival was created in the Caribbean. As Jeroen Dewulf pointed out, the term may have had a religious dimension, relating to the Akan deity Nyankompong, who was known in eighteenth-century English sources as John Company.

According to Edward Long, an 18th-century Jamaican slave owner/historian, the John Canoe festival was created in Jamaica and the Caribbean by enslaved Akans who backed the man known as John Canoe. Canoe, an Ahanta from Axim, Ghana, was an ally soldier for the Germans, until one day he turned his back on them for his Ahanta people and sided with Nzima and troops in order to take the area from the Germans and other Europeans. The news of his victory reached Jamaica and he has been celebrated ever since that Christmas of 1708 when he first defeated Prussic forces for Axim. Twenty years later his stronghold was broken by neighbouring Fante forces aided by the military might of the British.

Ahanta, Nzima and Fante captives were taken to Jamaica as prisoners of war. The festival itself included motifs from battles typical of Akan fashion. The many war masks and war dance formations of Ahanta people became part of this celebration the world over, especially in the Caribbean. The elaborate masks and attire resemble Akan battledress with charms, referred to as a "Batakari".

Description
Many of the colonies Jonkonnu was prominent, The Bahamas, Jamaica, (as Jankunu), Virginia celebrated Jonkonnu.

Historian Stephen Nissenbaum described the festival as it was performed in 19th-century North Carolina: 
Essentially, it involved a band of black men—generally young—who dressed themselves in ornate and often bizarre costumes. Each band was led by a man who was variously dressed in animal horns, elaborate rags, female disguise, whiteface (and wearing a gentleman's wig!), or simply his "Sunday-go-to-meeting-suit." Accompanied by music, the band marched along the roads from plantation to plantation, town to town, accosting whites along the way and sometimes even entering their houses. In the process the men performed elaborate and (to white observers) grotesque dances that were probably of African origin. And in return for this performance they always demanded money (the leader generally carried "a small bowl or tin cup" for this purpose), though whiskey was an acceptable substitute.

Popular culture
The Junkanoo parade has featured in movies including the James Bond film Thunderball (erroneously described as a local Mardi Gras-type festival), After the Sunset, and Jaws The Revenge, as well as in the season one episode "Calderone's Return (Part II)" of the 1984 television series Miami Vice, taking place on the fictitious island of St. Andrews.

A song titled “Junkanoo Holiday (Fallin’-Flyin’)” appears on Kenny Loggins’ 1979 album Keep The Fire. The song was written by Loggins. This song immediately  follows the hit song "This Is It" on the album. “This Is It” has a fade ending that segues into “Junkanoo Holiday (Fallin’-Flyin’)”, omitting a complete break between the two songs.

In the thirteenth episode of the television show Top Chef: All-Stars, "Fit for a King", the contestants danced at a Junkanoo parade, learned about its history and competed to make the best dish for the Junkanoo King.

The post-Covid return to Junkanoo was briefly discussed across the two-part episodes 189 and 190 of Nicole Byer and Sasheer Zamata's podcast, Best Friends, documenting their trip to the Bahamas.

Gallery

See also
Carnival
Pitchy patchy
 John Canoe, the 1708 king of Axim, after whom the practice may have been named

References

Further reading

 
 
 
 

Bahamian music
Parades in the Bahamas
Nassau, Bahamas
December observances
January observances
Folk festivals in the Bahamas
Cultural festivals in the Bahamas
Carnivals in the Bahamas
Bahamian culture
Carnival